Furneaux is an interim Australian bioregion that includes the Furneaux Group of more than one hundred islands off the northeast coast of Tasmania, as well as the northeast corner of Tasmania and Wilson's Promontory on the Australian mainland.

Furneaux Island, located at the eastern entrance to Bass Strait, is home to a range of native plants and animals, including the Furneaux burrowing crayfish, a threatened species of crayfish in the family Parastacidae, endemic to Australia.

See also

 Ecoregions in Australia
 Interim Biogeographic Regionalisation for Australia
 Regions of Tasmania

References

Further reading
 

Furneaux
IBRA regions
Furneaux Group
North East Tasmania